In the Land of Hi-Fi is a 1955 studio album by the American jazz singer Sarah Vaughan. It was recorded October 25–27, 1955, in New York City. Alternate takes from these sessions, featuring a young Cannonball Adderley, were compiled on The Complete Sarah Vaughan On Mercury, Vol. 1 - Great Jazz Years 1954-1956.

Track listing
"Over the Rainbow" (Harold Arlen, E.Y. "Yip" Harburg) – 3:30
"Soon" (George Gershwin, Ira Gershwin) – 2:37
"Cherokee" (Ray Noble) – 2:32
"I'll Never Smile Again" (Ruth Lowe) – 2:35
"Don't Be on the Outside" (George Kelly, Mayme Watts, Sidney Wyche) – 3:01
"How High the Moon" (Morgan Lewis, Nancy Hamilton) – 2:36
"It Shouldn't Happen to a Dream" (Duke Ellington, Don George, Johnny Hodges) – 3:20
"Sometimes I'm Happy" (Vincent Youmans, Irving Caesar) – 2:57
"Maybe" (G. Gershwin, I. Gershwin) – 2:34
"An Occasional Man" (Ralph Blane, Hugh Martin) – 2:33
"Why Can't I?" (Richard Rodgers, Lorenz Hart) – 2:54
"Oh My" (Joe Greene) – 2:21

Personnel
 Sarah Vaughan – vocals

The Ernie Wilkins orchestra
 Ernie Royal, Bernie Glow – trumpet
 Kai Winding, J. J. Johnson – trombones
 Cannonball Adderley, Sam Marowitz – alto saxophone
 Jerome Richardson – flute, tenor saxophone
 Jimmy Jones – piano
 Turk Van Lake – guitar
 Joe Benjamin – double bass
 Roy Haynes – drums
 Ernie Wilkins – arranger, conductor

Production
Dennis Drake – remixing, remastering
Ellie Hughes, Tom Hughes – artwork, design
Seth Rothstein, Richard Seidel – preparation
Bob Shad – producer

References

1955 albums
Sarah Vaughan albums
Albums arranged by Ernie Wilkins
EmArcy Records albums
Albums conducted by Ernie Wilkins
Albums produced by Bob Shad